Anıtlı (formerly Kaledran or Kaliteran) is a village in the Anamur district of Mersin Province, Turkey.

Geography 
Anıtlı is on Turkish state highway , which runs from west to east in southern Turkey, and is situated to the east of a creek named Kaledran. It is the westernmost point of Mersin Province. Yakacık, the former quarter of the village at the west of the creek is now in the neighbouring Antalya Province. However, although the two parts of the village are officially separated and renamed, the residents still prefer to use the name Kaledran for both parts.
The population is of Anıtlı is 784 as of 2011.

Economy
Like many Mediterranean coastline villages, Anıtlı produces vegetables and  fruits, especially bananas. Although the transportation facilities over the state highway are not adequate for an extensive tourism program, the village has natural beaches.

References

External links
A local news page (in Turkish)

Populated coastal places in Turkey
Villages in Anamur District